Lukas Meindl GmbH & Co.KG, most commonly known as Meindl, is a German footwear manufacturer located in Kirchanschöring, Bavaria, known for its hiking boots for hiking and hillwalking. The company was founded in 1683 by Petrus Meindl.

Meindl currently produces the "Desert Fox" combat boots that are issued to soldiers of the British Military (including Royal Marines) in Iraq and Afghanistan, Felix Baumgartner also used Meindl boots in his 2013 jump from space.

In 2015, the Meindl Desert Defence was selected to equip French troops for deployment to theaters with a hot climate. It remains the desert combat boots of the French Army as of 2021, complementing the standard Haix Nepal Pro combat boots.

References

External links 
Meindl's Official Web Site
Meindl's Official NZ Web Site

Manufacturing companies of Germany
Climbing and mountaineering equipment companies
Shoe companies of Germany
Companies based in Bavaria